This page is about verbs in Hungarian grammar.

Lemma or citation form
There is basically only one pattern for verb endings, with predictable variations dependent on the phonological context.

The lemma or citation form is always the third person singular indefinite present. This usually has a ∅ suffix, e.g. kér ("ask", "have a request").

-ik verbs
A slight variation to the standard pattern is with certain verbs which have third person singular indefinite present ending with -ik, e.g. dolgozik ("s/he works"), and 1st singular indefinite present usually with -om/-em/-öm. The stem for this is reached by removing -ik. These verbs are one of the reasons why this form is the citation form.

The -ik verbs were originally middle voice, reflexive or passive in meaning, which can still be seen e.g. about the pair tör ("s/he breaks something") vs törik ("something breaks" / "something gets broken"). However, most of them have lost this connection (they can have active meanings) so historically speaking they are like deponent verbs. Some verb pairs only differ in the presence or absence of the -ik ending, while they are unrelated in meaning, such as ér ('be worth something' or 'arrive') and érik ('ripen').

With these verbs, the third person singular (present indefinite indicative) form (i.e., the lemma) consistently uses the -ik form. What is more, new -ik words continue to be created  (e.g. netezik "use the Internet").

However, the first person singular (present indefinite indicative) suffix is often assimilated to the "normal" conjugation (as it has happened to the other -ik-specific forms), so most verbs usually take the regular form for this person (e.g. hazudok; *hazudom would be taken as hypercorrect or incorrect). Nevertheless, with some basic -ik verbs, the assimilated variant is stigmatized (e.g. eszem is expected in educated speech, rather than *eszek), so with these verbs, the traditional form is advised. At any rate, such non-traditional, assimilated variants are not rare in colloquial spoken language.

Since this (3rd person singular indefinite) -ik ending coincides with the -ik ending of the 3rd person plural definite form, only the type of the object makes it possible to identify the subject:
eszik egy almát: egy almát "an apple" is indefinite, so the verb must be a singular form, i.e. "s/he is eating an apple;"
eszik az almát: az almát "the apple" is definite, so the verb must be a plural form, i.e. "they are eating the apple."
In fact, most -ik verbs are intransitive, and the context may clarify the question even if the subject is not made explicit.

Some important "traditional" -ik verbs are the following. A person may appear uneducated if s/he uses the -k ending with them for the 1st person singular form:
aggódik "worry", álmodik "dream", alszik "sleep", bízik "trust", dicsekszik "brag", dohányzik "smoke", dolgozik "work", emlékszik "remember", érdeklődik "be interested or inquire", érkezik "arrive", esküszik "swear", eszik "eat", fázik "be cold", fekszik "lie" ("recline"), foglalkozik "deal with", gondolkodik or gondolkozik "be thinking", gondoskodik "look after", gyanakszik "suspect", gyönyörködik "delight in", hallatszik "be audible", haragszik "be angry", hiányzik "be missing", igyekszik "strive, hurry", iszik "drink", játszik "play", jelentkezik "apply", költözik "move (residence)", következik "follow", különbözik "differ", lakik "live" (inhabit), látszik "be visible", működik "function", növekszik "grow", nyugszik "rest", öregszik "grow old", panaszkodik "complain", származik "originate from", találkozik "meet", tartozik "owe" or "belong", tartózkodik "stay" ("reside"), törődik "care about", unatkozik "be bored", vágyik "desire", változik "change" (refl.), verekszik "fight" (e.g. at school), veszekszik "quarrel", vetkőzik "take off clothes", viselkedik "behave" and vitatkozik "argue".

For most other verbs, the -k ending is common in the indefinite meaning, especially in casual speech. Verbs ending in -zik, which refer to using some tool, almost exclusively take the -k, such as biciklizik "ride the bicycle", gitározik "play the guitar" or mobilozik "use the mobile phone".

There are a few non-traditional -ik verbs where the -m ending is impossible and ungrammatical (except in the definite conjugation, if meaningful). These are called "pseudo ik verbs" (álikes igék) in Hungarian. Examples:
bomlik "dissolve", (el)bújik "hide", egerészik "catch mice", érik "ripen", folyik "flow", gyűlik "assemble" (refl.), hazudik "tell a lie", hullik "fall", illik "suit", kopik "wear off", megjelenik "appear", múlik "pass", nyílik "open" (refl.), ömlik "pour" (refl.), születik "be born", (meg)szűnik "discontinue", telik "fill up", tojik "lay (eggs)", törik "get broken", tűnik "seem", válik "become" or "divorce", züllik "become depraved".

The regular non -ik verb könyörög "beg" has a hypercorrect first-person singular indefinite present form könyörgöm "I am begging" (used especially as an emphatic interjection to support an argument in spoken language), which conjugation mimics that of -ik verbs. The correct form would be könyörgök. However, it is argued by some that the form  könyörgöm is not unacceptable, either, and it reflects an idiomatic expression könyörgöm (magát/az Istent) "I am begging (you/God)", which has eventually lost its object and in which the form könyörgöm actually (correctly) follows definite conjugation.

Infinitive
The infinitive of a verb is the form suffixed by -ni, e.g. várni, kérni. There is a variant -ani/eni, which is used with the following groups:
 verbs ending in two consonants (e.g. játszani, tartani, küldeni, választani, festeni, mondani, hallani, ajánlani),
 verbs ending in a long vowel + t (e.g. fűteni, véteni, tanítani, bocsátani) and
 the words véd and edz (védeni and edzeni respectively).

Exceptions are állni "to stand", szállni "to fly", varrni "to sew", forrni "to boil", which have -ni despite the two consonants.
This is due to the fact that, in written language, the "long" 'l' or 'r' of the stem has to be kept even in the forms where it is pronounced short.

Infinitive with personal suffixes
When an infinitive is used with an impersonal verb, the personal suffixes may be added to the infinitive to indicate the person, as in Portuguese. Except in the 3rd person singular and plural, the -i of the infinitive is dropped, e.g. Mennem kell. ("I have to go."). The person can also be indicated using -nak/-nek, e.g. Nekem kell mennem. ("I have to go.), Jánosnak mennie kell ("János has to go.")

These forms use the o/e/ö set of suffixes (Type II, like possessive suffixes do), see Personal suffixes and link vowels.

Tenses
Most verbs have two inflected tenses, past and present, and a future form using an auxiliary verb. The verb lenni, to be, has three inflected tenses: past (volt = was), present (van = is) and future (lesz = will be).

Present
In the present tense, only sibilant-ending verbs differ from the rest, such as verbs ending in -s, -sz, -z and -dz. The chart below compares the conjugation of the regular kér 'ask' ("have a request") and vár 'wait' (as examples for front and back vowels) with the sibilant-ending keres 'look for' and mászik 'climb.' Example of verbs ending in the other two possible sonorants, -z and -dz, are húz 'pull' and edz 'train', which similarly double their stem consonants where -s and -sz are doubled (e.g. húzzuk, eddzük in the first person plural).

*: mászik being an -ik verb, its indefinite 1st person singular form can be mászom instead of mászok in literary style. The ik ending in its indefinite 3rd person singular form naturally doesn't apply to verbs without this ending.

The forms marked in bold are those where the suffix of sibilant-ending verbs differ from the suffix of other verbs: either because of the alternative 2nd person ending l (to avoid two sibilants getting next to each other), or because of the assimilation of j. Incidentally, the latter forms (with doubled stem consonants) coincide with the subjunctive (or imperative) forms.

Futurity
Futurity can be expressed in a variety of ways:
By the auxiliary verb fog for any verb except van, expressing a strong intention or a necessity of events brought about by circumstances (fog menni = "will go", fog beszélni = "will speak")
The verb van, uniquely, has an inflected future tense (leszek, leszel etc.). (See van (to be).)
By the present tense, when this is clearly a reference to a future time (e.g. the presence of explicit temporal adverbs, e.g. majd = soon) or in the case of verbs with perfective aspect). (Compare, eg "We're visiting Disneyland" in English: normally this indicates present tense, but adding "next July" makes it unambiguously future tense).

Past tense

The past tense is expressed with the suffix -t or -ott/-ett/-ött and inflects for person and number.  As in the present tense, there are special indefinite forms for transitive verbs with direct objects that are 1st or 2nd person or indefinite, while definite forms are used for intransitive verbs and transitive verbs with definite, 3rd person direct objects, and there is a special form used just for instances where there is a 1st person subject and 2nd person direct object.

As far as the two phonetic variants are concerned, there are three types:
 Type I never uses link vowel (mostly those with "soft" ending consonants, i.e. sonorants)
 Type II only uses link vowel in the 3rd person singular indefinite (those that could be regarded as "middle-hard" consonants)
 Type III uses link vowel in every form (mostly those ending in the "hard" consonant t or a consonant cluster).

Note: Strike-through Roman numbers in the last row refer to the types which would apply if the verbs concerned were regular.

If the above phonetic guidelines don't help, it may be useful as a rule of thumb to learn the rules and exceptions only for Type I and Type III and use Type II otherwise, because this latter type comprises the broadest range of verbs.

Regular homonymy of plain and causative forms in the same tense
Front-vowel unrounded verbs that end in consonant + -t may have ambiguous (coinciding, homophonous) forms between plain and causative forms. Approximately a hundred verbs are concerned that end in one of the following endings: -jt, -lt, -mt, -nt, -rt, -st, -szt.

The past tenses of sejt ("suspect", Type III) and sejtet ("make them suspect something", Type II) are identical, except for the third person indefinite form where it is sejt|ett for sejt, but sejtet|ett for sejtet. However, it usually turns out from the argument structure and the context which meaning is intended.

This ambiguity doesn't occur with back-vowel verbs because the linking vowel is different for the normal past tense and the causative, e.g. bontotta "s/he demolished it" (bont- + -otta) vs. bontatta "s/he had it demolished" (bont- + -at- + -ta). The linking vowel can only be o for back-vowel verbs (as stated above: -ott/-ett/-ött) and the causative can only have a with back vowels (-at/-et). Similarly, it doesn't occur with front-vowel verbs with a rounded vowel, either: e.g. gyűjtötte ("s/he collected them") vs gyűjtette (s/he had them collected").

Below is a chart to review the conjugation differences between coinciding forms of the same verb. Ambiguous forms in the same person are marked in bold.

Regular homonymy: other cases

Another kind of ambiguity can arise with type I verbs between the second person plural plain form and the first person singular causative form, e.g. beszéltetek (only indefinite forms involved):
"you [pl] spoke": beszél ("speak") + -t- (past) + -etek ("you [pl]")
"I make somebody speak": beszél + -tet- (causative) + -ek ("I").

It can also occur with similar back-vowel verbs, e.g. csináltatok "you [pl] did something" or "I have something done".

beszéltek can also have two interpretations (only indefinite forms involved, again):
"you [pl] speak": beszél + -tek ("you [pl]")
"they spoke": beszél + -t- (past) + -ek ("they")

This latter case is not possible with back-vowel verbs, due to the difference of the linking vowel: csináltok "you [pl] do something" vs. csináltak "they did something".

Below is a chart to review the conjugation differences between coinciding forms of the same verb (again). Ambiguous forms in different persons are marked with asterisks.

Sporadic coincidences
Front-vowel verbs in type III that end in -t may cause ambiguity, like between the past tense of a verb and the present tense of another. For example:

Below is a chart to review the conjugation differences between coinciding forms of unrelated verbs. Ambiguous forms in the same person are marked in bold; ambiguous forms in different persons are marked with asterisks.

Moods
Hungarian verbs have 3 moods: indicative, conditional and subjunctive / imperative. The indicative has a past and non-past tense. The conditional has a non-past tense and a past form, made up of the past tense indicative as the finite verb with the non-finite verb volna. The subjunctive only has a single tense.

Conditional
Use of the conditional:

In a sentence with "if", unlike in English, the appropriate conditional tense is used in both the "if" clause and the main clause. The present conditional is used to talk about unlikely or impossible events in the present or future, e.g. Ha találkoznál a királynővel, mit mondanál? ("If you met [lit.: would meet] the Queen, what would you say?"). The past conditional is used for past events which did not happen, e.g. Ha nem találkoztunk volna a királynővel, órákkal ezelőtt megérkeztünk volna. ("If we hadn't [lit.: wouldn't have] met the Queen, we would have arrived hours ago.") (cf. the English counterfactual conditional).

Forms of the conditional

The front-vowel suffix at the end of the 1st person singular indefinite form of the back-vowel verb (várnék) is an apparent exception from the vowel harmony: it may serve to distinguish from the 3rd person plural definite form (várnák). (The indefinite kérnék forms still coincide, just like the 1st and 2nd person plural endings.)

The only opposition between the 3rd person singular definite and indefinite forms is vowel length (although a–á and e–é differ in quality as well), which can be considered one of the rare fusional traits in Hungarian.

A linking vowel is inserted into verbs with a consonant cluster or long vowel + t at the end, e.g. festenék 'I would paint', tanítanék 'I would teach', analogously to the rules given for the infinitive form.

Subjunctive (imperative)

Uses of the subjunctive:
For a command (i.e. an imperative)
For a request
For hesitant questions with 1st singular subject (cf. English "Shall I …?")
For suggestions for joint action with 1st plural subject (cf. English "Let's …")
For wishes (3rd person singular and plural)
In subordinate clauses after verbs expressing orders, requests, suggestions, wishes, permission, etc.
In hogy subordinate clauses expressing purpose

Forms of the subjunctive
In the subjunctive or imperative mood, verbs with a sibilant or t ending differ from the rest, with two groups for the t ending: those with a preceding short vowel, and those with a preceding long vowel or a consonant.

Meanings of the verbs below: kér 'ask (have a request)', vár 'wait', keres 'look for', olvas 'read', fest 'paint', szeret 'love', fut 'run', ment 'save', tanít 'teach', böngészik 'browse', mászik 'climb', ereszt 'let go', akaszt 'hang', néz 'look at', húz 'pull', edz 'train', lopódzik 'sneak'.

Note 1: Fest 'paint' is the only single example (according to the  Reverse-alphabetical dictionary of the Hungarian Language) that ends in st, and there is no -ik verb with these two ending consonants. This verb is conjugated like the szeret, fut type: fessek, fess(él), fessen, fessünk, fessetek, fessenek; fessem, fes(se)d, fesse, fessük, fessétek, fessék; fesselek.

Note 2: the definite conjugation may be ungrammatical for verbs that cannot have an object, e.g. fut 'run', lopódzik 'sneak'. However, these forms may occur in constructions like végigfutja a távot 'run all through the distance', or perhaps even végiglopóddza az épületeket 'sneak through the buildings'. This solution doesn't work, though, for the forms affecting the 2nd person (unless in a poetic, vocative sense), that is why they are marked with an asterisk.

Forms marked with a preceding equality sign are identical with the indicative forms.

Second person forms have a short and a long variant both in indefinite and definite conjugation, with minimal difference in style.

Definite and indefinite conjugations
In Hungarian, verbs not only show agreement with their subjects but also carry information on the definiteness of their direct objects. This results in two types of conjugations: definite (used if there is a definite object) and indefinite (if there is no definite object):

Basically, the indefinite conjugation is used if there is no definite object, that is i) if there is no object at all, or ii) if the object is indefinite (see details below). However, exceptionally, the indefinite conjugation is also used if the object is a 1st- or 2nd-person pronoun, either stated or not (even though the reference of personal pronouns is definite by nature).

An object is indefinite if it is: 
a noun with no determiner
a noun with an indefinite article
a noun with a numeral or an indefinite determiner (e.g. "any, some, every" but not "all [the]")
an indefinite pronoun such as "something, anything, everyone" etc.
an interrogative pronoun (except "which?")
a first- or second-person pronoun, whether stated or unstated
a relative pronoun

The definite conjugation is used if the verb has a definite object, which can be:
 a proper noun (some types with zero article, other types preceded by a definite article)
a noun with a definite article
a noun with the determiners melyik, hányadik ('which'), mindegyik ('each'), or az összes ('all'); the noun may be omitted in these constructions
a 3rd-person pronoun, either stated or unstated
 the reflexive pronoun (a form of maga, '-self')
a demonstrative pronoun ("this, that")
the indefinite pronoun mind ('all [of something]'), including mindkét ('both'), or a noun phrase determined by it
a subordinate clause (like "[the fact] that…" or "if/whether…")

A special suffix (-lak/-lek) is used if the verb has a first-person singular subject AND a second-person (singular or plural) object (in the informal conjugation), e.g. Szeretlek. ("I love you" ― singular), Szeretlek titeket. ("I love you all" ― plural).

Examples:

No explicit object

If no explicit object is present, the most common interpretation of the definite verb forms is including "him/her/it". If an indefinite verb form semantically requires an object, "me" or "you [sg]" or – obviously – an indefinite object (third person) can be inferred: "something". (The plural forms are generally made explicit.) This difference makes it possible for the writer or speaker to refer to people without making them explicit. In most cases it is enough through the context to differentiate between 3rd-person and non-3rd-person pronouns.

Definite examples:
olvassa ("s/he is reading") – most common meaning: s/he is reading it (the book etc.)
nézi ("s/he is looking") – most common meaning: s/he is looking at him/her/it

Indefinite examples:
fut ("s/he is running") – usually can't have an object so its meaning is unambiguous
olvas ("s/he is reading") – most common meaning: s/he is reading something (the object may be omitted like in English)
néz ("s/he is looking") – most common meaning: s/he is looking at me or you (or: gazing in the air)

Grammatical voice

Hungarian uses active forms not only in the active sense (e.g. "He opened the door") and in the middle voice sense (e.g. "The door opened"), but also to express the passive (e.g. "The door was opened by Jane"), with the third person plural active form. For example, Megvizsgálják a gyereket literally means "They examine the child", but it is more commonly meant like "The child is examined". The fact that this sentence behaves like a passive voice is shown by the fact that the above (third person plural) form can be used even when only one agent is meant (i.e., the child is examined by one doctor). 

Another means to express the passive meaning is using middle voice lexical forms or unaccusative verbs, e.g. épül: "build"/ intransitive (cf. épít "build"/ transitive), alakul: "form"/ intransitive (cf. alakít "form"/ transitive). -ul/-ül is a common ending that expresses the middle voice, as opposed to -ít which expresses the active (these are transitive verbs). Middle voice forms can also be created from some plain verbs by adding -ódik/-ődik, e.g. íródik "get written" (from ír "write"), ütődik "get hit" (from üt "hit"). These active/middle pairs comprise a considerable part among Hungarian verbs.

In the perfect, there is a third way to express passive meaning: the existential verb van (see van (to be)) plus the adverbial participle ending in -va/-ve (see Adverb derivation), e.g. meg van írva "it is written" (from megír "write"). It is used when the result of the action is emphasized. It can be formed in the past perfect and future perfect, too, with the past and future forms of van. – A similar structure is used in a past meaning with lett: meg lett írva "it was written" or "it has been written" (sometimes "it had been written").

Finally, the actual passive form does occur once in a while, formed with -atik/-etik or -tatik/-tetik. For example: születik ("be born", from szül "give birth"), adatik ("be given", from ad "give"), viseltetik ("owe somebody certain feelings", from visel "bear"), foglaltatik ("be included", from (magába) foglal "include"). These can be formed by adding -ik to the causative (see Modal and causative suffixes). Most of these forms (except for születik) are considered obsolete.

An example of a regular verb
Here is a regular verb, kér ("ask", "have a request"). The personal suffixes are marked in bold.

Modal and causative suffixes
Hungarian has 2 forms which can be added to the verb stem to modify the meaning. These are sometimes referred to as infixes, but they are not true infixes because they are not inserted inside another morpheme.

-hat-/-het- has a modal meaning of permission or opportunity, e.g. beszélek "I speak", beszélhetek "I may speak" or "I am allowed to speak".

Note: Ability ("I can speak") is usually expressed with "tud". See Auxiliary verbs (modal and temporal).

-at-/-et- and -tat-/-tet- have a causative meaning. It can express "having something done" or "having/making someone do something". For example: beszélek "I speak", beszéltetek "I make somebody speak". (Incidentally, it is the same form as "you [pl] spoke", analysed beszél|t|etek, see Past tense.)

-tat/-tet is used if the word ends in vowel + -t or if the stem ends in a consonant different from -t, but it has two or more syllables (excluding the verbal particle). In other cases, -at/-et is used: that is, with words ending in a consonant + t and with one-syllable words ending in a consonant different from -t.

The monosyllabic words which don't end in vowel + -t, but have -tat/-tet in the causative are áz|ik (áztat), buk|ik (buktat), kop|ik (koptat), szop|ik (szoptat), hány (hánytat), él (éltet), kel (keltet), lép (léptet), szűn|ik (szüntet [!]), jár (jártat), szök|ik (szöktet).

Verbal noun
A noun is formed from a verb by adding -ás/-és to the verb stem (cf. gerund in English), e.g. Az úszás egészséges. ("Swimming is healthy.")

Participles
There are three participles in Hungarian. They are formed by adding the following suffixes to the verb stem:
-ó/-ő - present participle, e.g. író ember ("a writing person")
-ott/-ett/-ött/-t - past participle, e.g. megírt levél ("a written letter" /"the letter that has been written")
-andó/-endő - future participle, e.g. írandó levél ("a letter to be written")

Since the past participle usually expresses a perfected action/event, the verb sometimes changes into its perfective counterpart by taking a verbal particle (igekötő) with this function, as seen in the above example (megírt levél). This verbal particle may, however, be replaced by a noun, e.g. Annának írt levél ("a letter written to Anna"). – See more under Hungarian syntax.

Verb particles /prefixes (igekötők)
Hungarian verbs can have verb particles or prefixes, similar to phrasal verbs in English. The most common ones are meg- (perfective, but some other ones, too, can take this function), fel- ("up"), le- ("down"/"off"), be- ("in"), ki- ("out"), el- ("away"), vissza- ("back"), át- ("over"/"through"), oda- ("there"), ide- ("here"), össze- ("together"), szét- ("apart"), "rá-" ("on top").

The above meanings are the literal meanings, but they all can have figurative, idiomatic meanings. Examples of literal meanings for the verb ír ("write"): leír ("write down"), beír ("write into") as opposed to the non-literal meanings: leír ("declare as useless", cf "write off"), beír ("give a written warning [to a schoolchild]"). Different prefixes can express subtle differences (e.g. meghízik "get fat"  vs. elhízik "get obese", literally "fatten away") as well as independent concepts (e.g. rúg "kick", kirúg "fire somebody", berúg "get drunk"). They often serve to change the verb into perfective (along with other factors).

When the particle precedes the verb without any other inserted word, they are used as one word, e.g. Leírja ("He writes it down"). Syntactically, the particle may go behind the verb for various reasons. It may occur due to a stressed part in the sentence (the focus), e.g. Ő írja le ("It's him who writes it down") or a negation, e.g. Nem írja le ("He doesn't write it down"). The inverted order is also used in the imperative, e.g. Írja le! ("Write it down!"). Finally, it may also refer to continuity, like Lement a lépcsőn ("He went down the stairs") vs. Ment le a lépcsőn ("He was going down the stairs").

If the verb with the particle is in the infinitive, the finite verb will be wedged between them, e.g. Le akarja írni ("He wants to write it down") or Le tudja írni ("He can write it down").

The particle may considerably affect the case of the complement: for example, the verb kezd ("start something") can take several different verb particles, all expressing the same concept (with minor differences), but their complement differs depending on the particle:
elkezd valamit (accusative)
nekikezd valaminek (dative)
belekezd valamibe (illative)
hozzákezd valamihez (allative)
It happens because certain verb particles (the latter three among the examples) come from personal pronouns in the given case and they require agreement.

When giving a short positive answer to a yes/no question, the particle can refer back to the whole sentence, see Yes/no questions.

In literary style, articles can be reduplicated to indicate a gradual or stuttering action: ki-kijött a mὁkus ("the squirrel crept out").

Cases needing attention

There are a few words which appear to begin with a particle, but don't actually, e.g. felel ("reply"), lehel ("breathe/puff"), kiált ("give a shout") and beszél ("speak") where fel-, le-, ki- and be- are parts of the words themselves, rather than actual particles. The difference is important in the above-mentioned syntactic cases when these elements will – naturally – not function like particles do. Compare the above kiált (no compound) with ki|áll ("stand out", a compound): nem kiált ("he doesn't give a shout"), but nem áll ki ("he doesn't stand out"). – A similar case is fellebbez ("appeal [in court]"), from the adverb fellebb ("upper", today: feljebb), containing no particle.

A verb may occasionally be a homonym in the above sense, i.e. being a single word or containing a particle, e.g. betűz ("spell [by letters]", no compound), but be|tűz ("stick in" or "shine in", a compound).

The other misleading cases are those verbs which were historically formed from nouns derived from verbs with particles, so they seemingly begin with particles, but they don't behave like them. An example is befolyásol ("influence", v) which derives from befolyás ("influence", n), a calque from German Einfluß, literally "in-flow", including the particle be- ("in"). This element, being part of the original noun, will not act as a particle of the derived verb befolyásol. There are few such words, e.g. kivitelez ("implement") from kivitel ("implementation, execution", cf "carrying out"). Kirándul ("go hiking") used to be a compound (ki + rándul), but people don't usually treat it like that anymore so they say, e.g., Kirándulni akar. ("s/he wants to go hiking") instead of Ki akar rándulni, which is obsolete and only used jokingly. A common error among native speakers is the case of feltételez ("suppose" or "assume"), which comes from feltétel ("condition"), so the prefix is only part of the embedded noun, rather than of the full verb, but it is still often separated: ?fel sem tételezhetjük, ?fel kell tételeznünk ("we can't even assume, we must suppose"), instead of the correct forms nem is feltételezhetjük, feltételeznünk kell. What functions as a verbal prefix sometimes may not be one other times, e.g. ellenáll 'resist' can separate like nem állok ellen 'I don't resist', but ellenőriz 'check' stays together like nem ellenőrzök 'I don't check' – because the latter is derived from the noun ellenőr ("inspector").

Auxiliary verbs (modal and temporal)
Most Hungarian auxiliary verbs are impersonal; beside them, the suffixed infinitive is used. A few are conjugated. (Note: personal suffixes are marked in bold.)

The suffix -hat/-het mentioned in the last row can be further conjugated, just like any verb.

The verb lehet is used impersonally, e.g. oda lehet menni "one can go there".

The verb szokik
The verb szokik is conjugated like a regular past tense one (though it can have the indefinite and the definite forms, too), however, used with an infinitive, it has the meaning of a habitual action which includes the present time.

Examples:
Szoktam álmodni ("I dream usually")
Meg szoktam mosni ("I usually wash it")

Irregular verbs
The verbs van ("to be"), jön ("to come") and megy ("to go")  have an irregular present tense and irregular stems for different tenses. jön also has irregular forms in the subjunctive. A further group of 9 verbs have irregular stems for different tenses, but follow the same pattern of irregularity as each other. A few other verbs shorten or drop a vowel with certain suffixes.

van (to be)
The verb "to be" in Hungarian is van (3rd person), lenni (infinitive).

Use
When the verb is used as a copula i.e. if one speaks about what someone or something is, it is omitted in the third person singular and plural of the present tense. The verb is required in all other tenses and persons when speaking about where or how something is, or to emphasize the existence or availability of something. Examples:
 Péter orvos ∅. – Peter is a doctor. (present tense, third person, speaking about what someone is: no linking verb in Hungarian)
 Péter jól van. – Peter is well.
 Péter itt van. – Peter is here.
 Péter orvos volt. – Peter was a doctor.
 Orvos vagyok. – I am a doctor.

The non-copula form of van is also used to express the equivalent of "There is/are":
 Van orvos a szobában. – There is a doctor in the room.

The negation of the third person van (plural vannak) as a non-copula verb is the suppletive nincs (plural nincsenek):
Itt van Péter. – Peter is here.
Nincs itt Péter. – Peter isn't here.

Hungarian has no verb which is equivalent to "to have". Instead, ownership/possession are expressed using van with a possessive suffix on the noun:
Van könyvem. ("I have a book.", literally "There-is book-my")

Conjugation
Like the verb "to be" in many other languages, van is irregular. It comes from three (or four) bases: vagy- (or van-), vol-, and len-. These overlap to some extent with the verb lesz ("become"). As it cannot have an object, it does not have definite forms. It is the only verb in Hungarian which has a future form.

There is little difference between the two conditional forms. In theory, lennék etc. are preferred when an option is considered as possible (e.g. Ha otthon lennék, "if I were at home") and volnék etc. are preferred when it is considered impossible (e.g. Ha rózsa volnék, "if I were a rose"), but the limits are rather vague. It is probably not by chance that the former is akin to the future form (leszek), which might still become true, and the latter to the past form (voltam), which is already determined. In practice, the lennék series is somewhat more frequently used in both senses.

External links

 Hungarian verb conjugator, with opportunity for testing and practising
 Online morphology charts at the website of the Research Institute for Linguistics of the Hungarian Academy of Sciences
 Hungarian verb conjugator Jargot.com's verb conjugator

Verb
Verbs by language